Paul A. Dixon  (born 28 October 1962) is an English former professional rugby league footballer who played in the 1980s and 1990s.

Playing career
During the 1985–86 season, Dixon played in all 30 League games, and scored 11-tries in Halifax's victory in the Championship.

Dixon played left-, i.e. number 11, in Halifax's 19–18 victory over St. Helens in the 1987 Challenge Cup Final during the 1986–87 season at Wembley Stadium, London on Saturday 2 May 1987.

Dixon won caps for Great Britain while at Halifax in 1987 against France, in 1988 against France (2 matches), in the 1985–1988 Rugby League World Cup against Papua New Guinea, on the 1988 Great Britain Lions tour against Australia (2 matches), while at Leeds in 1990 against Papua New Guinea, in the 1989–1992 Rugby League World Cup against Papua New Guinea, in 1990 against New Zealand (2 matches), in the 1989–1992 Rugby League World Cup against New Zealand, in 1990 against Australia (3 matches), and in 1992 against France.

References

External links
Great Britain Statistics at englandrl.co.uk (statistics currently missing due to not having appeared for both Great Britain, and England)
(archived by web.archive.org) Meninga saves the day*(archived by web.archive.org)
(archived by web.archive.org) When Britain defeated the Aussies

1962 births
Living people
Bradford Bulls players
Canterbury-Bankstown Bulldogs players
English rugby league players
Gold Coast Chargers players
Great Britain national rugby league team players
Halifax R.L.F.C. players
Huddersfield Giants players
Leeds Rhinos players
Oldham R.L.F.C. players
Rugby league players from Huddersfield
Rugby league props
Rugby league second-rows
Sheffield Eagles (1984) players
Yorkshire rugby league team players